Nyamasheke is a district (akarere) in Western Province, Rwanda. Its capital is Nyamasheke town (Kagano).

Sectors
Nyamasheke district is divided into 15 sectors (imirenge): Ruharambuga, Bushekeri, Bushenge, Cyato, Gihombo, Kagano, Kanjongo, Karambi, Karengera, Kirimbi, Macuba, Nyabitekeri, Mahembe, Rangiro, Shangi.

History
Nyamasheke was originally part of the colony of German East Africa, which included what are now Burundi, Rwanda and Tanganyika.  Nyamasheke's Lake Kivu is the site of the first German colonial military post, founded in 1898 by Kapitan Berthe, a German Army officer.  Shangi sector was chosen by the Germans for its strategic position on Lake Kivu border with the Congo. The site is also known for having served for the first Rwandan religious mass in 1899.

The District saw considerable bloodshed during the Rwandan genocide.  In 2006, Nyamasheke became home to the Rwanda National Genocide Memorial.

Recent events
In 2009, the prosecutor for the International Criminal Tribunal for Rwanda (ICTR) announced that it was in possession of evidence implicating former businessman Yussuf Munyakazi in the genocidal massacres that occurred in 1994 in Nyamasheke.  Munyakazi, a former wealthy rice farmer in the Western Province, was charged with counts of genocide, or complicity in the alternative and extermination as a crime against humanity.  On 30 June 2010, the ICTR found Yussuf Munyakazi guilty of genocide and extermination as a crime against humanity, and sentenced him to 25 years’ imprisonment.<ref name="HAG">Yussuf Munyakazi Sentenced To 25 Years, The Hague Justice Portal, retrieved 26 February 2012</ref>  The ICTR specifically found that Munyakazi was a leader in massacres in Shangi sector on 29 April 1994 and Mibilizi sector on 30 April 1994 that resulted in the deaths of over 5,000 Tutsi.

After reports of harassment of genocide survivors in the district, several genocide survivors were recently been murdered in Nyamasheke.Mugisha, Stevenson and Kagire, Edmund, Genocide Survivor Murdered in Nyamasheke, Rwanda New Times, 15 April 2009  In April 2009, Séraphine Uwankwera, a resident of Kagatamu cell, was killed between 7:45-8 pm on April 12 and dumped on the roadside in the Bushenge sector of Nyamasheke District.  The deceased was murdered as she was coming from Gashirabwoba Genocide memorial site also in Bushenge sector where she had gone to attend a Genocide commemoration ceremony where some of her family members who were killed are buried.  Uwankwera was found lying in a pool of blood April 13.  A relative of Uwankwera stated that the murderers are Genocide suspects who wanted to prevent testimony conceal evidence attesting to their role in the 1994 genocide.

Cooperatives and education
The district is home to the COPMONYA (Coopérative de Potérie et des Matériaux Ornementaux de Nyamasheke) a cooperative that produces ornamental pottery.  Coffee beans are produced at several collectives, including the Rwanda Impala Collective near Shanga.  Nyamasheke also hosts the 137-member Abizarana coffee cooperative centered on the Shangi washing station.  The district features an active TVET program designed to improve the quality of the work force.

References
 
 Inzego.doc — Province, District and Sector information from MINALOC'', the Rwanda ministry of local government.

Western Province, Rwanda
Districts of Rwanda